Remington House can refer to the following:

 Frederic Remington House, listed on the NRHP in Connecticut
 Remington House (Kinne Corners, New York), listed on the NRHP in New York
 Potter-Remington House, listed on the NRHP in Rhode Island